Frank May may refer to:
 Frank May (cashier)
 Frank May (cricketer)